D. Christopher Evans is an American law enforcement officer who served as the acting administrator of the Drug Enforcement Administration.

Early life and education 
Evans is a graduate of Rutgers University with a Bachelor of Arts degree in urban studies and a Master of Arts in political science.

Career 
Evans began his law enforcement career with the Drug Enforcement Administration (DEA) in 1992.

Evans previously served as chief of operations and assistant administrator of the DEA's Operations Division, as well as chief of the DEA's Special Operations Division.

References 

Living people
Year of birth missing (living people)
Rutgers University alumni
Drug Enforcement Administration Administrators